Osman Abdel Hafeez (30 March 1917 – 14 August 1958) was an Egyptian épée and foil fencer. He competed at the 1948 and 1952 Summer Olympics. He was one of six members of the Egyptian fencing team who perished on board KLM Flight 607-E on 14 August 1958.

Personal life
Hafeez had three brothers, Saleh, Ibrahim, and Fathy, as well as two sisters: Zeinab and Fatma. He was married to Isis Ismail Sabry, the daughter of a pediatrician. She is the sister of Ahmed Sabry his fellow fencing champion who was on the same doomed flight. He had a son, Ismail, and a daughter, Pakinam.

Medals and honors
The main hall in the Egyptian Fencing Club is named after Hafeez, as well as a street in Nasr City, Cairo, Egypt and a school in his hometown of Shibin El Kom, Egypt.

References

External links
 

1917 births
1958 deaths
Egyptian male épée fencers
Egyptian male foil fencers
Olympic fencers of Egypt
Fencers at the 1948 Summer Olympics
Fencers at the 1952 Summer Olympics
Victims of aviation accidents or incidents in international waters
People from Monufia Governorate
Victims of aviation accidents or incidents in 1958
20th-century Egyptian people